Pampanga's 2nd congressional district is one of the four congressional districts of the Philippines in the province of Pampanga. It has been represented in the House of Representatives of the Philippines since 1916 and earlier in the Philippine Assembly from 1907 to 1916. The district consists of the western Pampanga municipalities of Floridablanca, Guagua, Lubao, Porac, Santa Rita and Sasmuan. It is currently represented in the 19th Congress by Gloria Macapagal-Arroyo of the Lakas–CMD (Lakas).

Representation history

Election results

2022

2019

2016

2013

2010

See also
Legislative districts of Pampanga

References

Congressional districts of the Philippines
Politics of Pampanga
1907 establishments in the Philippines
Congressional districts of Central Luzon
Constituencies established in 1907
Constituencies established in 1987
Constituencies disestablished in 1972